{{DISPLAYTITLE:C12H16O3}}
The molecular formula C12H16O3 (molar mass : 208.25 g/mol) may refer to: 

 Asarone, an ether found in certain plants.
 Elemicin, a constituent of the essential oil of nutmeg.
 Isoelemicin
 Oudenone, a fungal metabolite.